A rheophile is an animal that prefers to live in fast-moving water.

Examples of rheophilic animals

Insects
Many aquatic insects living in riffles require current to survive.
Epeorus sylvicola, a rheophilic mayfly species (Ephemeroptera)
Some African (Elattoneura) and Asian threadtail (Prodasineura) species

Birds

Dippers (Cinclus)
 Grey wagtail (Motacilla cinerea) and mountain wagtail (Motacilla clara)
A few swifts often nest behind waterfalls, including American black swift (Cypseloides niger), giant swiftlet (Hydrochous gigas), great dusky swift (Cypseloides senex) and white-collared swift (Streptoprocne zonaris)
Some waterfowl, including African black duck (Anas sparsa), blue duck (Hymenolaimus malacorhynchos), Brazilian merganser (Mergus octosetaceus), bronze-winged duck (Speculanas specularis), harlequin duck (Histrionicus histrionicus), Salvadori's teal (Salvadorina waigiuensis) and torrent duck (Merganetta armata)

Fish
A very large number of rheophilic fish species are known and include members of at least 419 genera in 60 families. Examples include:

 Many species in the family Balitoridae, also known as the hill stream loaches.
 Many species in the family Loricariidae from South and Central America
 Many Chiloglanis species, which are freshwater catfish from Africa
 The family Gyrinocheilidae.
 Rheophilic cichlid genera/species:
The Lamena group in the genus Paretroplus from Madagascar.
Oxylapia polli from Madagascar.
Retroculus species from the Amazon Basin and rivers in the Guianas in South America.
Steatocranus species from the Congo River Basin in Africa.
Teleocichla species from the Amazon Basin in South America.
Teleogramma species from the Congo River Basin in Africa.
Mylesinus, Myleus, Ossubtus, Tometes and Utiaritichthys, which are serrasalmids from tropical South America
 The Danube streber (Zingel streber), family Percidae.

Molluscs
Ancylus fluviatilis
Aylacostoma species
Lymnaea ovata

Amphibians
Neurergus strauchii, a newt from Turkey
Pachytriton labiatus, a newt from China

See also
Lotic ecosystem

References 

Aquatic animals
Freshwater ecology
Rivers
Water streams